The Austronesian Formal Linguistics Association (AFLA) is a learned society that hosts forums for collaborative research on Austronesian languages. Founded in 1994 at the University of Toronto, AFLA is now administered from the University of Western Ontario. Conferences are held annually at a multitude of institutes across the globe, including Tokyo University of Foreign Studies (AFLA 2016), Vrije Universiteit Amsterdam (AFLA 2000), and Academia Sinica (AFLA 2018) located in Taipei, Taiwan. The most recent 2019 conference was held in its home administration at the University of Western Ontario. Due to the COVID-19 pandemic, the AFLA 2020 conference was postponed and tentatively rescheduled for August 20 at the National University of Singapore.

Founders 
Anna Maclachlan - author of "Optimality and three western Austronesian case systems" and 13 other research papers on Austronesian language

Diane Massam - professor in the department of Linguistics at the University of Toronto where she is involved in many research efforts

Richard McGinn - accomplished linguist who taught a numerous universities including Ohio University. McGinn died at the age of 78

Barry Miller - attended York University in Toronto an co-founded AFLA with Massam

Lisa Travis - currently a professor of Linguistics at McGill University

Timeline 
AFLA Conference I (1994): Held at the University of Toronto, with attendees being students and faculty.
AFLA Conference II (1995): Held at McGill University
AFLA Conference III (1996): Held at the University of California at Los Angeles
AFLA Conference IV (1997): Held at the University of California at Los Angeles
AFLA Conference V (1998): Held at the University of Hawai'i at Manoa
AFLA Conference VI (1999): Held at the University of Toronto
AFLA Conference VII (2000): Held at Vrije Universiteit Amsterdam
AFLA Conference VIII (2001): Held at the Massachusetts Institute of Technology
AFLA Conference IX (2002): Held at Cornell University
AFLA Conference X (2003): Held at the University of Hawai'i at Manoa
AFLA Conference XI (2004): Held at Zentrum fur Allgemeine Sprachwissenschaft, Typologie und Universalienforschung
AFLA Conference XII (2005): Held at the University of California at Los Angeles
AFLA Conference XIII (2006): Held at the National Tsing Hua University and Academia Sinica
AFLA Conference XIV (2007): Held at McGill University
AFLA Conference XV (2008): Held at the University of Sydney
AFLA Conference XVI (2009): Held at the University of California, Santa Cruz
AFLA Conference XVII (2010): Held at Stony Brook University, New York
AFLA Conference XVIII (2011): Held at Harvard University
AFLA Conference XIX (2012): Held at the Institute of Linguistics, Academia Sinica & Linguistic Society of Taiwan
AFLA Conference XX (2013): Held at the University of Texas at Arlington
AFLA Conference XXI (2014): Held at the Institute of Linguistics, Academia Sinica & Linguistic Society of Taiwan
AFLA Conference XXII (2015): Held at McGill University
AFLA Conference XXIII (2016): Held at the Tokyo University of Foreign Studies
AFLA Conference XXIV (2017): Held at the University of Washington
AFLA Conference XXV (2018): Held at the Institute of Linguistics, Academia Sinica in Taipei, Taiwan
AFLA Conference XXVI (2019): Held at the Inter-faculty Program in Linguistics, University of Western Ontario
AFLA Conference XXVII (2020): Held at the National University of Singapore
AFLA Conference XXVIII (2021): Organised by the National University of Singapore and McGill University, Montréal
AFLA Conference XXIX (2022): To be held at the University of Manchester (as TripleAFLA, in collaboration with the TripleA workshop series)

See also 
 List of major and official Austronesian languages

Notes and references

External links 
 Austronesian Formal Linguistics Association—official website
LingAlert: AFLA 

Austronesian languages
Learned societies of Canada
1994 establishments in Ontario
Linguistic societies